The Honesty Room is the first album by singer/songwriter Dar Williams. It was released independently in 1993 and rereleased in 1995 on Razor & Tie.

Track listing
All songs written by Dar Williams.
"When I Was a Boy" – 4:46
"Alleluia" – 3:09
"The Great Unknown" – 4:15
"When Sal's Burned Down" – 4:16
"The Babysitter's Here" – 3:57
"You're Aging Well" – 4:13
"Traveling Again (Traveling I)" – 3:41
"In Love But Not at Peace" – 2:57
"Mark Rothko Song" – 3:44
"This Is Not the House That Pain Built" – 3:36
"I Love, I Love (Traveling II)" – 3:05
"Flinty Kind of Woman" – 2:44
"Arrival" – 2:54

Personnel
Dar Williams - Guitar (Acoustic), Vocals
Karen Casey - Violin
Max Cohen - Electric Guitar
Mark Dann - Bass, Guitar (Electric)
Guy DeVito - Bass
Craig Eastman - Mandolin, Viola, Violin
Gideon Freudmann - Cello
Rebecca Koehler - Violin
Tom McClung - Piano
Jaimé Morton - Handclapping
Katryna Nields	- Choir, Chorus
Nerissa Nields - Choir, Chorus
Dave Noonan - Drums
Adam Rothberg - Organ, Guitar (Acoustic), Dobro, Accordion, Guitar (Electric), Xylophone, Producer, Guitar (Bass), Conga

Track information and credits adapted from Discogs and AllMusic, then verified from the album's liner notes.

References

Dar Williams albums
1993 debut albums